The 7th Legislative Assembly of British Columbia sat from 1894 to 1898. The members were elected in the British Columbia general election held in July 1894.
Theodore Davie served as Premier until 1895 when he was named Chief Justice for the Supreme Court. John Herbert Turner succeeded Davie as Premier.

David Williams Higgins served as speaker until March 1898 when he resigned. John Paton Booth served as speaker for the remainder of 1898.

Members of the 7th General Assembly 
The following members were elected to the assembly in 1894:

Notes:

By-elections 
By-elections were held for the following members appointed to the provincial cabinet, as was required at the time:
 George Bohun Martin, Commissioner of Lands and Works, acclaimed November 15, 1894
 David McEwen Eberts, Attorney General, acclaimed April 15, 1895

By-elections were held to replace members for various other reasons:

Notes:

References 

Political history of British Columbia
Terms of British Columbia Parliaments
1894 establishments in British Columbia
1898 disestablishments in British Columbia
19th century in British Columbia